The Chicamacomico Life-Saving Station (CLSS) is a former station of the United States Life-Saving Service and United States Coast Guard. It is located in Rodanthe, North Carolina, on Hatteras Island in the Outer Banks, on the east side of what is today Highway 12. Today, the surviving buildings of the station form a museum.

History
After the U.S. Life-Saving Service and the United States Revenue Cutter Service merged in January 1915 to create the U.S. Coast Guard, Chicamacomico became a U.S. Coast Guard facility. Under Coast Guard control, it remained active until 1954. After its decommissioning the facility was transformed into a museum.

The CLSS is perhaps best remembered for the 1918 rescue of the British tanker Mirlo on August 16 1918. Mirlo was struck by a German torpedo fired by U117, about 5 miles offshore during World War I.  Forty-two crew members of the Mirlo were saved from the burning tanker by Keeper John Allen Midgett Jr. and his 
crew; Numerous accolades and awards were bestowed upon the 6 life-savers including gold medals in their honor presented by King George V of the United Kingdom and the Grand Cross of the American Cross of Honor.  To date only eleven Grand Cross of the American Cross of Honor awards have been bestowed in the history of the United States with six being bestowed upon the members of the CLSS.

Today, Chicamacomico forms the most complete USLSS site in the nation, and still presents the reenactment of the historic Beach Apparatus Drill every Thursday during summer tourist season. This drill includes during the historic Lyle Gun and rescuing a live victim from the simulated ship wreck.

References

External links

Chicamacomico Life-Saving Station - official site

Government buildings on the National Register of Historic Places in North Carolina
Government buildings completed in 1874
Hatteras Island
Transport infrastructure completed in 1874
Buildings and structures in Dare County, North Carolina
Life-Saving Service stations
Museums in Dare County, North Carolina
Maritime museums in North Carolina
National Register of Historic Places in Dare County, North Carolina
Historic Albemarle Tour
Life-Saving Service stations on the National Register of Historic Places
1874 establishments in North Carolina